Sir John Herkless (9 August 1855 – 11 June 1920) was a Scottish biographer and educator who was Principal and Vice Chancellor of the University of St Andrews and Principal of United College of St Salvator and St Leonard from 1915 to 1920. He was knighted in 1917 and was the author of several books mainly of an ecclesiastical nature.

He was born in Glasgow in 1855, the son of William Herkless, an engineer and Janet Robertson. He was educated in the High School of Glasgow before entering Glasgow University. He did not distinguish himself as a student and he left without a degree. However, he studied the arts and attended medical classes. Although he disliked mathematics, he was fond of philosophy. He then studied for the ministry and was duly licensed as a minister. He lectured on English Literature at Queen Margaret College, Glasgow, before becoming an assistant minister. This lasted till 1883 when he was appointed as minister to the parish of Tannadice in Angus. Herkless also held the post of Professor of Ecclesiastical History at the University of St Andrews.

During his career he wrote several books including: The Archbishops of St Andrews which he co-wrote with Robert Hannay and Francis and Dominic and the Mendicant Orders. His chief recreation was golf and he was a member of The Royal and Ancient Golf Club of St Andrews. He died in Dundee on 11 June 1920.

His career 
 1881-1883 - Tutor in English Literature, Queen Margaret College (Glasgow);
 1881-1883 - Assistant Minister, St Matthew’s Parish Church, Glasgow;
 1883-1884 - Minister of the parish of Tannadice in Angus;
 1894-1915 - Regius Professor of Ecclesiastical history, St Andrews University;
 1911-1915 - Provost of St Andrews;
 1913-1915 - Chairman of Fife County Insurance Committee;
 1915-1920 - Principal and Vice Chancellor of University of St. Andrews

Publications 
 Cardinal Beaton, Priest and Politician, London: William Blackwood & Sons, 1891.
 Richard Cameron, Edinburgh: Oliphant, Anderson and Ferrier, May 1896, ("Famous Scots Series").
 Francis and Dominic and the Mendicant Orders, Edinburgh: T. & T. Clark, 1901.
 The Early Christian Martyrs and their Persecutions, London: J. M. Dent, 1904, (Temple series of Bible handbooks).
 The College of St. Leonard: Being documents with translations, notes, and historical introductions, Prepared and edited by J. Herkless and R. K. Hannay, Edinburgh & London: William Blackwood & Sons, 1905.
 The Archbishops of St. Andrews, Edinburgh & London, William Blackwood & Sons, 1907.

References

1855 births
1920 deaths
Knights Bachelor
Writers from Glasgow
Principals of the University of St Andrews
Alumni of the University of Glasgow
Scottish Christian theologians
Scottish biographers
Scottish non-fiction writers
People educated at the High School of Glasgow
19th-century Ministers of the Church of Scotland
Historians of Christianity
Scottish knights
British historians of religion
20th-century Ministers of the Church of Scotland